The 1985–86 season was Colchester United's 44th season in their history and fifth consecutive season in fourth tier of English football, the Fourth Division. Alongside competing in the Fourth Division, the club also participated in the FA Cup, the League Cup and the Associate Members' Cup.

Colchester finished sixth in the league table come the end of the season, but were nine points distant of promoted Port Vale in fourth place. The U's were knocked out of the FA Cup by non-League opposition in Wycombe Wanderers in the first round, and exited the League Cup in the first round to Millwall. Despite a win against Southend United in the Associate Members' Cup, Colchester were defeated by Northampton Town who progressed from the group stages to the knockout phase of the competition.

Three weeks prior to the end of the season, manager Cyril Lea was sacked and replaced by former U's goalkeeper Mike Walker.

Season overview
Following regulation changes in the wake of the Heysel Stadium disaster and the Bradford City stadium fire, Layer Road was facing £500,000 of safety improvements to bring the ground up to standards. With the club ailing financially, sections of the ground were closed, reducing capacity to 4,900.

Manager Cyril Lea continued a trend of recruiting former Ipswich Town by bringing in forwards Robin Turner and Trevor Whymark during the season.

In October, the club were top of the table, but after suffering six successive league defeats, four without scoring, the club slid down the table and crashed out of the FA Cup to non-League Wycombe Wanderers. They had already made an early exit to Millwall in the League Cup and would soon follow suit in the Associate Members' Cup.

Lea struggled to find a strike partner for Tony Adcock following a car crash that ended Keith Bowen's playing career. The side were otherwise free scoring, and despite a good record, Lea was sacked three weeks ahead of the end of the campaign and replaced by Reserve team coach Mike Walker. Walker, initially in a caretaker capacity, took the U's on an unbeaten run for their final eight games of the season, winning five. This left the club in sixth position in the table, nine points shy of promotion.

The season was notable for hat-tricks, with Perry Groves twice achieving the feat against Southend United and brothers Tommy and Tony English scoring hat-tricks within five days of one another. The brothers were also both sent off at Crewe Alexandra in April, a game which Colchester won 2–0.

Players

Transfers

In

 Total spending:  ~ £0

Out

 Total incoming:  ~ £0

Loans in

Match details

Fourth Division

Results round by round

League table

Matches

League Cup

FA Cup

Associate Members' Cup

Squad statistics

Appearances and goals

|-
!colspan="16"|Players who appeared for Colchester who left during the season

|}

Goalscorers

Disciplinary record

Clean sheets
Number of games goalkeepers kept a clean sheet.

Player debuts
Players making their first-team Colchester United debut in a fully competitive match.

See also
List of Colchester United F.C. seasons

References

General
Books

Websites

Specific

1985-86
English football clubs 1985–86 season